Richard Bethell may refer to:

Richard Bethell (16th century MP), Member of Parliament (MP) for Winchester
 Richard Bethell, 1st Baron Westbury (1800–1873), British judge and Liberal politician, Lord Chancellor 1861–1865, MP for Aylesbury 1851–1859, for Wolverhampton 1859–1861
 Richard Bethell (1772–1864), MP for Yorkshire 1830–1831, for East Riding of Yorkshire 1832–1841
 Tony Bethell (Richard Anthony Bethell, 1922–2004), World War II Royal Air Force pilot and survivor of "the Great Escape"